Roots of the Cuban Missile Crisis is a 48-minute 2001 Cold War documentary by New Line Home Video with "film footage from the era [and] newly created interviews covering U.S./Soviet relations from post-WWII Europe through the end of the crisis". The documentary is a "Beyond the Movie feature" on the infinifilm DVD for the movie Thirteen Days and synthesizes archival footage and still photography, interviews, Trinity and Beyond documentary scenes, and Thirteen Days movie scenes and sequences (many with archival footage).

Topics regarding the crisis' roots covered by the film include the 1938 Munich Agreement, Yalta Conference, British withdrawal from Greece & Turkey, Berlin Airlift, Bomber Gap, Kennedy-Nixon Debate, Cuban Revolution, Missile Gap, Bay of Pigs Invasion, and Crateology. The last third of the film covers events of the crisis (e.g., Operation Ortsac, EXCOMM, Kennedy Presidential recordings) and includes film dramatized scenes from Thirteen Days.

Production staff and interviewees
Director: Alita Renee Holly
Producers: Alita Renee Holly & Elizabeth Westwood
Editor: Carol Oblath
Brugioni, Dino—CIA Photographic Interpreter
Donaldson, Sam—ABC News
Garthoff, Raymond—Brookings Institution
Kalb, Marvin—CBS News Moscow Bureau Chief
Kaplow, Herbert—NBC/ABC News Correspondent
Khruschchev, Sergei—son of Nikita Khruschchev
May, Prof. Ernest R.--Harvard University
Salinger, Pierre—Kennedy Administration Press Secretary
Self, David--Thirteen Days screenwriter
Szulc, Tad—Fidel Castro Biographer
Thomas, Helen—Hearst Newspapers Columnist
Westwood, Helen—ABC News London Bureau Chief
Zelikow, Prof. Philip—Director of The Miller Center, UVA

See also
 Cultural depictions of John F. Kennedy

References

External links
 

2001 films
Documentary films about the Cold War
Films about the Cuban Missile Crisis
2001 documentary films